ITA Award for Best Thriller/Horror Serial is an award given by Indian Television Academy as a part of its annual event.

Winners

References 

Indian Television Academy Awards